Berrogüetto was a folk band from Galicia, formed in the spring of 1995. They were signed to BOA records and released their first album Navicularia in 1996, going on to receive various awards.

The name Berrogüetto was born when the components of this artistic project met in Vigo to form and give a name to the new grouping. The name is a neologism, that has a triple origin "Berro" meaning "scream" or "shout" in Galician, "Güeto" from the word "ghetto" and, finally, "Soweto", the South African district where the fight against apartheid started. The amalgamation of these three names, of these three semantic ideas, is the word Berrogüetto, that would come to mean the shout of the ghetto - the oppressed ones. The group was disbanded in February 2014.

Members
 Anxo Pinto - Hurdy-gurdy, violin, saxophone, flute, piano, bagpipes
 Isaac Palacín - Percussion
 Quico Comesaña - Bouzouki and harp
 Quin Farinha - Violin
 Santiago Cribeiro - Accordion and piano
 Guillermo Fernandez - Guitar and bass
 Guadi Galego - Vocals and bagpipes

Discography

Albums
 1996: Navicularia
 1998: La Música Con El Sol (unpublished)
 1999: Viaxe por Urticaria
 2001: Hepta
 2006: 10.0
 2010: Kosmogonías

See also
 Galician traditional music

References

External links
 

Galician musical groups
Galician traditional music groups